Jakob Sverdrup may refer to:

Jakob Sverdrup (politician) (1845–1899), Norwegian bishop and politician
Jakob Sverdrup (philologist) (1881–1938), Norwegian philologist
Jakob Sverdrup (historian) (1919–1997), Norwegian historian